The Cathedral of the Nativity of the Theotokos is the main church of the city of Rostov-on-Don and the Orthodox Diocese of Rostov and Novocherkassk. It succeeded the Novocherkassk Cathedral as the main place of Christian worship in the Don region.

Background 
At the end of the 18th century, after a large-scale resettlement to suburbs of soldiers, burghers and merchants, the city authorities decided to build a temple dedicated to the Navity of the Theotokos. It was meant to be constructed in the same suburb, near the present-day Central market. The church was founded on February 20, 1781, and opened on September 5, 1781. Both the beginning of construction works and opening of the church were consecrated by Archpriest Ioann Andreev. However, only ten years after, on December 27, 1791, a lightning strike burned the temple.

The then mayor of the city ― M. Naumov, a merchant, petitioned to Metropolitan Gavriil, who was the head of Ekaterinoslav Diocese and supervised the territory of Rostov on the construction of the new church. In 1795 at the same place began the construction works of the Church of the Nativity of the Blessed Virgin. In 1822 the church received cathedral status on decree of the Holy Synod.

History 

In the mid-19th century, the population of Rostov was growing steadily. As a result, Emperor Nicholas I approved the draft for a new stone church instead of the old masonry temple with wooden domes that could not contain the crowds of worshippers.

The cathedral was built between 1854 to 1860 to Konstantin Ton's generic, or model design. As a result, the cathedral looks similar to other churches designed by Ton, such as the Cathedral of Christ the Saviour in Moscow, the demolished Presentation Church in St. Petersburg and the Cathedral of the Holy Ghost in Petrozavodsk. Alexander Kutepov was the architect in charge of construction works.

The funds for construction came from the rich merchant Konstantin Mikhailov-Nefedov. Another local merchant, Igor Panchenko, financed frescoes, icons, golden crosses for the domes, and the church fence.

In 1937 the cathedral was closed, and on its territory was opened a zoo, and the cathedral itself was used as warehouse. In the 1940s the upper tiers of the bell tower were destroyed.

The cathedral was opened again in 1942, when Rostov was occupied by German army. In 1950 the cathedral was redecorated and the old paintings were restored. In 1988 the interior redecoration was also done.

In 1999, on the 250th anniversary of the city of Rostov, the bell tower was restored in its original form.

Exterior and interior 
 
Nativity Cathedral is a five-domed stone church, the building itself has a shape of cross. It was built in Russian-Byzantine style. Three-tiered iconostasis in the eastern part of the cathedral is made in the form of a chapel, topped with hipped roof and cupola.

In the courtyard of the cathedral there are also situated a small Church of St. John the Baptist and the baptistery of St. Nicholas, as well as the bell tower and several office buildings: the diocesan administration, the residence of the Metropolitan of the Rostov diocese and diocesan departments and commissions; spiritual and educational center of St. Dimitry, Metropolitan of Rostov; printing house of the diocese; church utensils and spiritual literature shops.

The bell tower 
In 1875, the west side of the bell tower of the Cathedral was founded. It was built on project of architect-engineer Anton Campioni and artist-architect Dmitry Lebedev. Construction was carried out at the expense of merchants P. Maksimov and S. Koshkin, of tobacco manufacturer and philanthropist V. Asmolov, and of I. Panchenko, who already then had become a churchwarden. The bell tower was completed in 1887.

The bell tower has a height of 75 metres. It also has Classicist and Renaissance features. The top of the dome is blue, decorated with gold stars. In the top tier there were installed clocks. In the middle tiers there were placed bells It is believed that the ringing of the bell tower was heard over 40 kilometres.

During World War II there were fears that the bell tower can be used by the Germans as a reference point for artillery and bombers. In July 1942 the top two tiers were blown up. In 1949 the second tier was also demolished.

The bell tower was restored in 1999. Architect N. Solnyshkin was the author of restoration project. New bells differ from their predecessors with names and their smaller sizes.

References 

Churches in Rostov-on-Don
Russian Orthodox cathedrals in Russia
Churches completed in 1860
Cultural heritage monuments in Rostov-on-Don
Cultural heritage monuments of regional significance in Rostov Oblast